Philippe Coindreau is a French naval officer. He joined the Navy in 1979 and qualified as a pilot in 1984. He served as Major General of the Armed Forces from 1 September 2016 to August 31, 2018.

References

1959 births
Living people
Admirals of France
Military personnel from Toulon
École Navale alumni
Commandeurs of the Légion d'honneur
Grand Officers of the Ordre national du Mérite
Recipients of the Cross for Military Valour
Recipients of the Aeronautical Medal